Magnus Hans-Göran Johansson (born 17 January 1958 in Värnamo Municipality, Jönköping) is a Swedish Centre Party politician who served as Mayor of Värnamo Municipality from 2009 to 2021.

He is the father of Annie Lööf, the current leader of the Centre Party and the former Minister for Enterprise 2011 to 2014. He is a police officer by profession.

References 

Centre Party (Sweden) politicians
Living people
1958 births
Swedish police officers
People from Värnamo Municipality
Mayors of places in Sweden